The Reserves Magarey Medal is an Australian rules football honour awarded annually since 1906 to the fairest and most brilliant player in the South Australian National Football League (SANFL) Reserves competition, as judged by field umpires. The award is based on the Magarey Medal award that was introduced by William Ashley Magarey.

Winners

External source
 SANFL 2012 Annual Report - Click here and refer to pp. 102 for a list of winners from 1906-2012

References 

Australian rules football awards
South Australian National Football League
Awards established in 1906
1906 establishments in Australia